Margaret Elizabeth Rosemary Barton (born 26 July 1957) is an Ulster Unionist Party (UUP) politician from Northern Ireland. She is a native of County Fermanagh and worked as a secondary schoolteacher in Kesh before being elected as a UUP councillor for Fermanagh District Council, and was a Member of the Legislative Assembly (MLA) for Fermanagh and South Tyrone from 2016 to 2022.

Career 
Barton was a schoolteacher at Devenish College. During that time, she taught the future Northern Ireland national football team player Kyle Lafferty.

Political career 
Before being elected to the Northern Ireland Assembly, Barton was elected as a councillor for Fermanagh District Council and later Fermanagh and Omagh District Council. Barton was elected to the Northern Ireland Assembly in 2016 as the third woman elected to represent Fermanagh and South Tyrone alongside the First Minister of Northern Ireland Arlene Foster and Michelle Gildernew. Her election as an MLA meant that she was forced to vacate her seat on the District Council. Barton joined cross-community calls for an independent inquiry headed by the Lord Chief Justice of Northern Ireland into the Renewable Heat Incentive scandal.

Barton retained her seat in the 2017 election after Fermanagh and South Tyrone lost one seat, in common with all other constituencies, after the Assembly Members (Reduction of Numbers) Act (Northern Ireland) 2016 which led to the Democratic Unionist Party's Lord Morrow missing out. She would become the UUP's education spokesperson in the Assembly. During the 2018 Gaelic football season, Barton suggested Fermanagh GAA fans who "continually talk about the GAA team" in workplaces made unionist colleagues "apprehensive" and "uncomfortable" and amounted to "latent intimidation".

She lost her seat in the 2022 Northern Ireland Assembly election to her running mate, the former UUP leader, Tom Elliott.

In November 2022 Barton was co-opted to Fermanagh and Omagh District Council to fill a vacant UUP seat.

Personal life 
After having qualified as a teacher, Barton joined the Young Farmers' Clubs of Ulster in 1980 and met her future husband there. They married in 1984 in the Church of Ireland church in Clones, County Monaghan, Republic of Ireland. Barton expressed surprise when she was informed by the Belfast Telegraph that Wikipedia had cited her age incorrectly in 2017.

References

External links
Northern Ireland Assembly profile
Ulster Unionist Party profile

1957 births
Living people
Ulster Unionist Party MLAs
Northern Ireland MLAs 2016–2017
Northern Ireland MLAs 2017–2022
Place of birth missing (living people)
Female members of the Northern Ireland Assembly
Educators from Northern Ireland
Anglicans from Northern Ireland
Ulster Unionist Party councillors